Ivanhoe Lake Provincial Park is an operating natural environment class park and protected area in the Unorganized North Part of Sudbury District in Northeastern Ontario, Canada.

Facilities
The park has play areas adjacent to a sandy wading and swimming beach. It also has 120 camp sites of which 64 have electrical hookup, and offers showers, flush toilets, a store, canoe rental, and a boat launch.

Natural history
Ivanhoe Lake Provincial Park has a number of glacial features including eskers, kettle lakes and a kettle lake that has become a quaking bog. It is in the Boreal forest biome and has plant species such as wild rice and six species of orchids.

References

External links

Provincial parks of Ontario
Parks in Sudbury District
Protected areas established in 1990
1990 establishments in Ontario